The Billy Taylor Touch is an album by American jazz pianist Billy Taylor released in 1958 on the Atlantic label and featuring seven tracks recorded in 1951 that were originally released on a 10-inch LP as Atlantic's Piano Panorama series along with four more tracks recorded in 1957.

Reception

Allmusic awarded the album 4½ stars.

Track listing
All compositions by Billy Taylor except as indicated
 "You Make Me Feel So Young" (Josef Myrow, Mack Gordon) - 2:58
 "Earl May" - 4:50
 "Can You Tell by Looking at Me" - 4:24
 "I Get a Kick Out of You" (Cole Porter) - 4:14
 "Wrap Your Troubles in Dreams" (Harry Barris, Ted Koehler, Billy Moll) - 2:46
 "Willow Weep for Me" (Ann Ronell) - 3:31
 "Good Groove" - 3:04
 "What Is There to Say?" (Vernon Duke, Yip Harburg) - 3:03
 "Thou Swell" (Richard Rodgers, Lorenz Hart) - 3:14
 "The Very Thought of You" (Ray Noble) - 3:24
 "Somebody Loves Me" (Buddy DeSylva, George Gershwin, Ballard MacDonald) - 2:45
Recorded in New York City on February 20, 1951 (tracks 5-11) and October 28, 1957 (tracks 1-4)

Personnel 
Billy Taylor - piano
John Collins - guitar (tracks 5-11)
Earl May (tracks 1-4), Al McKibbon (tracks 5-11) - bass
Ed Thigpen (tracks 1-4), Shadow Wilson (tracks 5-11) - drums

References 

1958 albums
Atlantic Records albums
Billy Taylor albums
Albums produced by Nesuhi Ertegun